List of airports in Ivory Coast (Côte d'Ivoire), sorted by location.



List

See also 
 Transport in Ivory Coast
 List of airports by ICAO code: D#DI - Côte d'Ivoire (Ivory Coast)
 Wikipedia: WikiProject Aviation/Airline destination lists: Africa#Côte d'Ivoire

References

External links 
 Lists of airports in Ivory Coast (Côte d'Ivoire):
 Great Circle Mapper
 Aircraft Charter World
 World Aero Data

Ivory Coast
 
Airports
Airports
Ivory Coast